Karamian is a small island in the Java Sea, about 100 km off the coast of Borneo, which is administratively part of Sumenep Regency in East Java. Part of the Masalembu Islands, it is its own administrative village (of Karamian) and is populated by about 4,000 people.

Geography
Karamian is surrounded by the Java Sea, being one of the most isolated inhabited regions of Sumenep Regency. It is located over 200 km away from the regency's capital, with ships needing a 17-hour voyage to reach the island. The island's waters are also shallow, forcing cargo vessels to call at 2 miles off the island's shores. It has no prominent geographical feature, with the highest elevation being just 7 meters above sea level.

Demographics
In 2015, the island has a population of 3,986 (Statistics Indonesia estimate) living in 1,657 households. Islam is the majority religion by a large margin.

Economy and services
Fisheries employ about 1,000 in the island, compared to agriculture which employs just under 400 with coconuts and corn as the main crops. There is a public elementary school, with madrasa counterparts of elementary and junior high schools, but the island lacks a senior high. A Puskesmas sub-branch is also present.

References

Islands of East Java
Islands of the Java Sea